Grape Creek Independent School District is a public school district in north-central Tom Green County, Texas, that serves the community of Grape Creek and surrounding areas.  Grape Creek ISD has three campuses - Grape Creek High (grades 9-12), Grape Creek Middle (grades 6-8), and Grape Creek Elementary (grades PK-5).

In 2009, the school district was rated "academically acceptable" by the Texas Education Agency.

References

External links
Grape Creek ISD

School districts in Tom Green County, Texas